George Thorpe was a professional footballer, who played for Leeds United, Huddersfield Town and Chester City. He was born in Farnworth, near Bolton.

References

1900s births
English footballers
People from Farnworth
Association football goalkeepers
English Football League players
Leeds United F.C. players
Huddersfield Town A.F.C. players
Chester City F.C. players
1985 deaths